Neoandracantha is a genus of parasitic worms from the phylum Acanthocephala. The genus was created in 2017 by Amin & Heckmann  for the single species Neoandracantha peruensis.

The genus was differentiated from the closely related genus Andracantha Schmidt, 1975 because members of Andracantha have anteriorly enlarged pear-shaped Corynosoma-like trunks, only two fields of anterior trunk spines with occasional genital spines, and bilateral or tandem testes, and because proboscides of species of Andracantha have considerably fewer hooks that gradually decrease in size posteriorly.

Neoandracantha peruensis is an endoparasite in the Polymorphidae family of thorny-headed worms.

The larval stages (cystacanths) of Neoandracantha peruensis were described from the ghost crab Ocypode gaudichaudii collected from the Pacific coast of Peru. While it is uncommon to describe acanthocephalan taxa from immature stages, Amin & Heckmann (2017) claimed that the presence of clear-cut distinguishing features separating the present material from its nearest congeneric taxa, and the absence of adults, justified the erection of the new species N. peruensis.

Morphology
Specimens of N. peruensis have a slender trunk with two anterior swellings, 3 separate fields of spines on the foretrunk swelling, and no genital spines on the hindtrunk. The proboscis is heavily armored with 21–22 longitudinal rows of 22 hooks each. Hook no. 14 is more robust ventrally than dorsally. Cystacanths of N. peruensis also have a long tubular hindtrunk and the males have diagonal testes in the midtrunk swelling.

References

Polymorphidae
Acanthocephala genera
Endoparasites